Divá Bára is a 1949 Czechoslovak film. The film starred Josef Kemr.

Credited cast

Vlasta Fialová 	
Jana Dítetová 		
Marie Brozová 		
Robert Vrchota 		
Jaroslav Vojta 
Gustav Hilmar 	 	

Jan Pivec 		
Josef Kemr 	
Marie Rydlova 	
Antonin Rydl 		
Josef Marsálek 	 	
Josef Vosalík

References

External links
 Diva bara cz wiki
 

1949 films
1940s Czech-language films
Films based on works by Božena Němcová
Czechoslovak black-and-white films
Czechoslovak drama films
1949 drama films
1940s Czech films